Eobacterium is an extinct genus of bacteria from the Fig Tree Formation in Africa. It is about 3 billion years old, one of the oldest known  organisms. The discovery of Eobacterium and other Fig Tree organisms in the 1960s helped prove that life existed over three billion years ago.

References

 K.N. Prasad: An Introduction to Paleobotany.
 

Prehistoric bacteria